Iceland's first ambassador to the United Kingdom was Pétur Benediktsson in 1941. Iceland's current ambassador to the United Kingdom is Sturla Sigurjónsson.

List of ambassadors

See also
Iceland–United Kingdom relations
Foreign relations of Iceland
Ambassadors of Iceland

References

External Links 
List of Icelandic representatives (Icelandic Foreign Ministry website) 

1941 establishments
Main
United Kingdom
Iceland